The 1902 Victorian Football Association season was the 26th season of the Australian rules football competition. The premiership was won by the Richmond Football Club; it was the first premiership in the club's history.

Ladder 
The premiership was decided on the basis of the best record across sixteen rostered matches, with each club playing the others twice; in the event of a tie for first place, a playoff match would have been held to determine the premiership.

Richmond and Port Melbourne were in a close battle for the premiership, and for the second consecutive season the clubs had equal records entering the final weekend of games, making a playoff match a likely outcome. However, in the matches on the final Saturday, Richmond 7.10 (52) defeated Prahran 3.9 (27), and Port Melbourne 3.9 (27) lost to Williamstown 7.3 (45), so the premiership was decided in Richmond's favour without a playoff match.

Notable events 
 On 9 August at the Port Melbourne Cricket Ground, Port Melbourne 9.23 (77) defeated  0.0 (0), the latter failing even to attempt a shot on goal in the match. As of 2022, it is the only time a club has been held scoreless in a senior Association match since the modern scoring system was adopted in 1897.
 On Thursday 4 September, a match was played between a combined Association team and a combined League team at the Melbourne Cricket Ground. The League 9.17 (71) defeated the Association 4.3 (27) by 44 points. It was the first time that teams representing the rival competitions had played against each other since the breakaway of the League in 1897; another would not be played until 1915.

External links 
 Victorian Football Association/Victorian Football League History (1877-2008)
 List of VFA/VFL Premiers (1877-2007)

References 

Victorian Football League seasons
VFL